New York's 72nd State Assembly district is one of the 150 districts in the New York State Assembly. It has been represented by Manny De Los Santos since 2022.

Geography
District 72 is in Manhattan. The district includes portions of Washington Heights, Hudson Heights, Fort George, and Marble Hill.

Recent election results

2022

2022 special

2020

2018

2016

2014

2012

2010

2008

References

72